Tiexi Subdistrict is the subdistrict of Anda, Suihua, Heilongjiang, China. The subdistrict office at Second Street of Tiexi. The subdistrict is east to Caoqiao, Xinfadi, south to Yangcao, Nanlai. The area of subdistrict is 50.28 km², the shape of subdistrict is rectangle in east-west direction, it has inhabitants 94993.

Name 
Tiexi is meaning "the west of railway", the railway is Harbin-Manzhouli railway. Anda railway station is located to the north of Tiexi, and there are three highway running through the subdistrict: Mingshen highway, Anchang highway, and Hadabao highway.

Sub-divide 
Tiexi has six neighbourhoods:
 Neighbourhoods: Hongxing, Longhua, Changzheng, Shuichang, Dongfeng, Tianqiao

References 

Township-level divisions of Heilongjiang
Anda, Heilongjiang